The Hunter is the seventh studio album by Jennifer Warnes, released in 1992.

The Hunter was released five years after her breakthrough album Famous Blue Raincoat. Classified as adult contemporary, the album is jazz/R&B infused. The album includes several covers, including Todd Rundgren's "Pretending To Care", The Waterboys "The Whole Of The Moon", and "Way Down Deep", co-written by Amy La Television, and Warnes's mentor Leonard Cohen.

Track listing
 "Rock You Gently" (Henry Gaffney, Gregory Abbott) – 4:24
 "Somewhere, Somebody" (Larry John McNally, Andrew Kastner, Max Carl) – 2:47
 "Big Noise, New York" (Donald Fagen, Marcelle Clements) – 5:02
 "True Emotion" (Jennifer Warnes, John Fannin, Bill Ginn) – 4:05
 "Pretending to Care" (Todd Rundgren) – 4:43
 "The Whole of the Moon" (Mike Scott) – 5:00
 "Lights of Lousianne" (Warnes, Rob Muerer, Nancy Bacal) – 4:24
 "Way Down Deep" (Amy LaTelevision, Warnes, Leonard Cohen) – 5:45
 "The Hunter" (Warnes) – 4:52
 "I Can't Hide" (Warnes) – 4:49

Personnel 
 Jennifer Warnes – lead vocals, backing vocals (1, 2, 6, 8), ornithologist (7), additional voice (10)
 Roscoe Beck – synthesizers (1, 3), guitar (1), bass and drum programming (1), synth strings (3), programming (3), bass (3, 4, 6, 9, 10), horn arrangements (3), string bass (5, 7)
 Bill Ginn – synthesizers (1), Synclavier (5, 9), acoustic piano (6), marxophone (6), keyboard arrangements (9), string arrangements (9), keyboards (10)
 Russell Ferrante – keyboards (3, 4, 8), Hammond organ (4)
 Larry Steelman – synth strings (3)
 Randy Kerber – acoustic piano (5), synthesizers (5)
 Stephen Croes – Synclavier (5, 6, 9)
 Rob Meurer – synthesizers (7, 10), keyboards (10)
 Van Dyke Parks – accordion (7), arrangements (7)
 Kim Bullard – keyboards (9)
 Michael Landau – guitar (1, 3, 6), lead guitar (4)
 David Mansfield – guitar (1), ornithologist (7), lap steel guitar (8), fiddle (8)
 Robben Ford – guitar (3), lead guitar (4), rhythm guitar (4)
 David Grissom – guitar (6), acoustic guitar (8)
 Eric Johnson – nylon-string guitar (7), slide guitar (10)
 Richard Thompson – electric guitar (7)
 Mitch Watkins – acoustic guitar (7), archtop guitar (7)
 Jorge Calderón – bass (2, 8)
 Vinnie Colaiuta – drums (1, 3, 4, 6, 9, 10)
 John Robinson – drums (3)
 Tom Brechtlein – drums (10)
 Lenny Castro – percussion (1-6, 10), shaker (7, 8), ornithologist (7), congas (8), seed pod (8), tambourine (8)
 Paulinho da Costa – congas (8), dumbek (8), shaker (8), talking drum (8)
 Steve Forman – surdo (8), tar (8), rhythm composer (8)
 Judd Miller – wind synthesizer (1, 5, 6, 9)
 Bob Malach – saxophone (1)
 Larry Williams – saxophone (1)
 Bill Reichenbach Jr. – trombone (1)
 Jerry Hey – flugelhorn (1)
 Stephen Barber – horn arrangements (5, 6), string arrangements (5, 6), Synclavier (6)
 Suzie Katayama – cello (7)
 Larry Corbett – cello (9)
 Novi Novog – viola (7)
 Robert Becker – viola (9)
 Joel Derouin – violin (5, 6, 7, 9)
 Sid Page – violin (7, 9)
 Perla Batalla – backing vocals (1, 2)
 Max Carl – lead vocals (2), backing vocals (2)
 Donald Fagen – backing vocals (3)
 Frank Floyd – backing vocals (3)
 Kevin Dorsey – backing vocals (4, 8)
 Phillip Ingram – backing vocals (4)
 Arnold McCuller – backing vocals (4)
 Blondie Chaplin – lead vocals (8)

Production 
 Jennifer Warnes – producer
 Roscoe Beck – producer
 Elliot Scheiner – producer, engineer, mixing 
 Rob Meurer – original track producer (7, 10)
 Jorge Calderón – original track producer (8, 9)
 Walter New – associate producer, engineer
 Chet Himes – original track engineer (7, 10)
 Steven Strassman – original track engineer (7, 10)
 Paul Dieter – assistant engineer
 David Dill – assistant engineer
 Mark Harder – assistant engineer
 Sarah Jarman – assistant engineer
 Charlie Paakkari – assistant engineer
 Marnie Riley – assistant engineer
 Tom Winslow – assistant engineer
 Martin Brumbach – mix assistant 
 Chris Bellman – digital editing 
 Bernie Grundman – mastering 
 Veronica Albano – album coordinator 
 Melanie Penny – art direction, design 
 Peter DeLory – photography 
 Donald Miller – management

Studios
 Recorded at Acme Recording Studios (Sherman Oaks, CA); Amigo Studios and The Village Recorder (Los Angeles, CA); Capitol Studios, Conway Studios and Soundcastle (Hollywood, CA); Groove Masters (Santa Monica, CA); River Sound Studios and The Hit Factory (New York City, NY).
 Mixed at The Village Recorder
 Mastered at Bernie Grundman Mastering (Hollywood, CA).

References

1992 albums
Private Music albums
Jennifer Warnes albums